Emilio Lara Rodríguez (born October 7, 1970) is a retired male weightlifter from Cuba. He competed for his native country at the 1992 Summer Olympics, finishing in sixth place in the Men's Middle-Heavyweight division. He won a gold medal at the 1991 Pan American Games.

References
sports-reference

1970 births
Living people
Cuban male weightlifters
Weightlifters at the 1991 Pan American Games
Weightlifters at the 1992 Summer Olympics
Olympic weightlifters of Cuba
Pan American Games gold medalists for Cuba
Pan American Games medalists in weightlifting
Medalists at the 1991 Pan American Games
20th-century Cuban people
21st-century Cuban people